The United States Senate Committee on Homeland Security and Governmental Affairs is the chief oversight committee of the United States Senate. It has jurisdiction over matters related to the Department of Homeland Security and other homeland security concerns, as well as the functioning of the government itself, including the National Archives, budget and accounting measures other than appropriations, the Census, the federal civil service, the affairs of the District of Columbia and the United States Postal Service.  It was called the United States Senate Committee on Governmental Affairs before homeland security was added to its responsibilities in 2004. It serves as the Senate's chief investigative and oversight committee. Its chair is the only Senate committee chair who can issue subpoenas without a committee vote.

History
While elements of the committee can be traced back into the 19th century, its modern origins began with the creation of the Committee on Expenditures in the Executive Departments on April 18, 1921. The Committee on Expenditures in the Executive Department was renamed the Committee on Government Operations in 1952, which was reorganized as the Committee on Governmental Affairs in 1978. After passage of the Intelligence Reform and Terrorism Prevention Act of 2004, the committee became the Committee on Homeland Security and Governmental Affairs and added homeland security to its jurisdiction.

Of the five current subcommittees, the Permanent Subcommittee on Investigations is the oldest and most storied, having been created at the same time as the Committee on Government Operations in 1952. The Subcommittee on the Oversight of Government Management, the Federal Workforce, and the District of Columbia was established after the creation of the Committee on Governmental Affairs in 1978. The Subcommittee on Federal Financial Management, Government Information, Federal Services and International Security was created in 2003.

Two ad hoc subcommittees were established in January 2007 to reflect the committee's expanded homeland security jurisdiction. They were the Subcommittee on Disaster Recovery and the Subcommittee on State, Local, and Private Sector Preparedness and Integration. The Subcommittee on Contracting was added in 2009. In 2011, the Disaster and State, Local, and Private Sector subcommittees were merged to form the Subcommittee on Disaster Recovery and Intergovernmental Affairs.

Over the years, the Committee on Homeland Security and Governmental Affairs and its predecessors have dealt with a number of important issues, including government accountability, congressional ethics, regulatory affairs, and systems and information security. In 2003, after the Homeland Security Act of 2002 established the Department of Homeland Security, the committee adopted primary oversight of the creation and subsequent policies, operations, and actions of the department.

In the past decade, the committee has focused particularly on the Department of Homeland Security's ability to respond to a major catastrophe, such as Hurricane Katrina; the rise of homegrown terrorism in the United States; and the vulnerabilities of the nation's most critical networks, those operating systems upon which our national defense, economy, and way of life depend, such as the power grid, water treatment facilities, transportation and financial networks, nuclear reactors, and dams.

In February 2014, staff working for committee ranking member Senator Tom Coburn issued a report raising concerns that some passwords protecting highly sensitive government data "wouldn’t pass muster for even the most basic civilian email account."

Jurisdiction
In accordance of Rule XXV(k) of the United States Senate, all proposed legislation, messages, petitions, memorials, and other matters relating primarily to the following subjects is referred to the Senate Homeland Security Committee:
 Archives of the United States;
 Budget and accounting measures, other than appropriations, except as provided in the Congressional Budget Act of 1974;
 Census and collection of statistics, including economic and social statistics;
 Congressional organization, except for any part of the matter that amends the rules or orders of the Senate;
 Department of Homeland Security, as provided in S.Res.445.
 Federal Civil Service;
 Government information;
 Intergovernmental relations;
 Municipal affairs of the District of Columbia, except appropriations therefor;
 Organization and management of United States nuclear export policy;
 Organization and reorganization of the executive branch of Government;
 Postal Service; and
 Status of officers and employees of the United States, including their classification, compensation, and benefits.

The committee also has the duty of:
 receiving and examining reports of the Comptroller General of the United States and of submitting such recommendations to the Senate as it deems necessary or desirable in connection with the subject matter of such reports;
 studying the efficiency, economy, and effectiveness of all agencies and departments of the Government;
 evaluating the effects of laws enacted to reorganize the legislative and executive branches of the Government; and
 studying the intergovernmental relationships between the United States and the States and municipalities, and between the United States and international organizations of which the United States is a member.

Members, 118th Congress

Subcommittees

Chairpersons

Committee on Expenditures in Executive Departments, 1921–1952
 Medill McCormick (R-Ill.) 1921–1925
 David A. Reed (R-Pa.) 1925–1927
 Frederic M. Sackett (R-Ky.) 1927–1930
 Guy D. Goff (R-W.Va.) 1930–1931
 Frederick Steiwer (R-Ore.) 1931–1933
 J. Hamilton Lewis (D-Ill.) 1933–1939
 Frederick Van Nuys (D-Ind.) 1939–1942
 J. Lister Hill (D-Ala.) 1942–1947
 George D. Aiken (R-Vt.) 1947–1949
 John L. McClellan (D-Ark.) 1949–1952

Committee on Government Operations, 1952–1977
 John L. McClellan (D-Ark.) 1952–1953
 Joseph R. McCarthy (R-Wis.) 1953–1955
 John L. McClellan (D-Ark.) 1955–1972
 Samuel J. Ervin Jr. (D-N.C.) 1972–1974
 Abraham A. Ribicoff (D-Conn.) 1974–1977

Committee on Governmental Affairs, 1977–2005
 Abraham A. Ribicoff (D-Conn.) 1977–1981
 William V. Roth, Jr. (R-Del.) 1981–1987
 John H. Glenn, Jr. (D-Ohio) 1987–1995
 William V. Roth, Jr. (R-Del.) 1995
 Theodore F. Stevens (R-Alaska) 1995–1997
 Fred D. Thompson (R-Tenn.) 1997–2001
 Joseph I. Lieberman (D-Conn.) 2001
 Fred D. Thompson (R-Tenn.) 2001
 Joseph I. Lieberman (D-Conn.) 2001–2003
 Susan M. Collins (R-Maine) 2003–2005

Committee on Homeland Security and Governmental Affairs, 2005–present
 Susan M. Collins (R-Maine) 2005–2007
 Joseph I. Lieberman (I-Conn.) 2007–2013
 Tom Carper (D-Del.) 2013–2015
 Ron Johnson (R-Wis.) 2015–2021
Gary Peters (D-Mich.) 2021–present

Historical committee rosters

117th Congress

Subcommittees

116th Congress

Subcommittees

See also
List of current United States Senate committees

Notes

References

External links

 Official Committee Website (Archive)
 Senate Homeland Security and Governmental Affairs Committee. Legislation activity and reports, Congress.gov.
 U.S. Government Printing Office (GPO) Page for the Committee of Homeland Security and Governmental Affairs

Homeland Security
Disaster preparedness in the United States
1921 establishments in Washington, D.C.